Anarak District is a district (bakhsh) in Nain County, Isfahan Province, Iran. At the 2006 census, its population was 2,904, in 970 families.  The District has one city: Anarak. The District has one rural district (dehestan): Chupanan Rural District. The district of Anarak has a local dialect which is related to the dialect spoken in Nain County.

References 

Nain County
Districts of Isfahan Province